David McLean Davis (born 8 April 1962) is an Australian politician. He has been a Liberal member of the Victorian Legislative Council since March 1996, representing East Yarra Province from 1996 until 2006 when it was abolished and the Southern Metropolitan Region from 2006 onwards. He was state Minister for Health from 2010 to 2014 under Premiers Ted Baillieu and Denis Napthine.

Early career
Davis was born in Millicent, South Australia and studied in Melbourne, Victoria. He was educated at Kingswood College (Box Hill). He studied applied science at the Phillip Institute of Technology (now part of the Royal Melbourne Institute of Technology). Davis also later studied philosophy at the University of Melbourne. He worked as a chiropractor and maintained a private practice until being elected to the Legislative Council in 1996.

Political career
Davis had become involved with the Liberal Party during the early 1990s, serving as a delegate on several party committees, and acting as a delegate to the party's State Council between 1993 and 1995. This was to ultimately result in receiving preselection for the safe Liberal seat of East Yarra at the 1996 state election. After the Liberal Party's defeat at the 1999 state election, Davis became the Chair of the Opposition Waste Watch Committee. In this position, he was one of the Labor government's strongest critics, regularly making claims of perceived abuses. In 2000, he became the Parliamentary Secretary for Scrutiny of Government.

Davis almost lost his seat of East Yarra in the 2002 election, but became Shadow Minister for Health, replacing Ron Wilson, who had lost his seat in the 2002 election. In September 2004, Davis announced that if elected, a Liberal government would ban smoking in pubs and clubs. This was followed by a decision from the state government weeks later to the same effect. Davis was often an opponent of Robert Doyle's leadership of the parliamentary Liberal Party. In 2005 Doyle transferred Davis to the lower-profile environment portfolio. In May 2006, after Doyle's resignation and replacement by Ted Baillieu, Davis was once again promoted and given Baillieu's former portfolio of planning.

Following the 2006 election, Davis was again promoted by Baillieu to the position of Shadow Minister for State and Regional Development. In January 2008 he was elected Leader of the Opposition in the Legislative Council. Between February 2008 and November 2009, Davis was appointed as the Shadow Minister for Environment and Climate Change and in November 2009, he was appointed Shadow Minister for Health and Ageing, maintaining his responsibility for Scrutiny of Government.

On Monday 22 February 2021, David Davis asserted "I would have booed at the tennis too when they mentioned Daniel Andrew's name", even though what the CEO of Tennis Australia said to receive booing from some spectators was "With vaccinations on the way, rolling out in many countries around the world, it’s now a time for optimism and hope for the future," and (in reference to people she wished to thank), "The top of that list is the Victorian government, without you, we could not have done this."

Davis was appointed Shadow Treasurer in late 2021 following Matthew Guy's return to the Liberal leadership.

In February 2022, Davis, along with Matthew Guy, Peter Walsh, Gary Blackwood and Melina Bath, were fined $100 each for breaching face mask rules, after the Coalition MPs were photographed maskless while attending an event in Parliament House.

After incumbent member for Kew Tim Smith confirmed that he would not seek re-election at the 2022 Victorian state election, Davis nominated for preselection for the seat, a move which some believed to be an attempt to succeed Matthew Guy as leader of the Liberal Party should the Liberals fail to win the 2022 state election. Business Council of Australia director Jess Wilson was ultimately endorsed as the Liberal candidate for Kew, defeating Davis 99-64.

In March 2022, Davis was criticised for being ‘hammered’ at a multicultural gala and allegedly ‘making people feel uncomfortable by touching, hugging and getting too close to people.’ Davis apologised in a written statement for his behaviour.

David was a member of the ‘Kennett faction’ of the Victorian Liberals. He voted for Matthew Guy in his successful 2021 leadership challenge against Michael O’Brien.

References

External links
 Parliamentary voting record of David Davis at Victorian Parliament Tracker

1962 births
Living people
Liberal Party of Australia members of the Parliament of Victoria
Members of the Victorian Legislative Council
People from Millicent, South Australia
21st-century Australian politicians